Oeosporangium is a  genus of ferns in the subfamily Cheilanthoideae of the family Pteridaceae. The genus has not always been recognized. In the Pteridophyte Phylogeny Group classification of 2016 (PPG I) it was included in Allosorus (a genus since subsumed into Aleuritopteris). It was accepted by the Checklist of the Ferns and Lycophytes of the World . As circumscribed there, the genus is native to the Old World.

Species
, the Checklist of Ferns and Lycophytes of the World recognized the following species:

Oeosporangium belangeri (Bory) Fraser-Jenk.
Oeosporangium chinense (Baker) Fraser-Jenk.
Oeosporangium chusanum (Hook.) Fraser-Jenk.
Oeosporangium contiguum (Baker) Fraser-Jenk.
Oeosporangium coriaceum (Decne.) Fraser-Jenk. & Pariyar
Oeosporangium delicatulum (Tagawa & K.Iwats.) Fraser-Jenk. & Pariyar
Oeosporangium elegans (Poir.) Fraser-Jenk. & Pariyar
Oeosporangium fragile (Hook.) Fraser-Jenk.
Oeosporangium guanchicum (Bolle) Fraser-Jenk. & Pariyar
Oeosporangium hancockii (Baker) Fraser-Jenk.
Oeosporangium hispanicum (Mett.) Fraser-Jenk. & Pariyar
Oeosporangium insigne (Ching) Fraser-Jenk.
Oeosporangium kuhnii (Milde) Fraser-Jenk.
Oeosporangium mairei (Brause) Fraser-Jenk.
Oeosporangium nitidulum (Hook.) Fraser-Jenk.
Oeosporangium pteridioides (Reichard) Fraser-Jenk. & Pariyar
Oeosporangium patulum (Baker) Fraser-Jenk.
Oeosporangium pauperculum (Christ) Fraser-Jenk. & Pariyar
Oeosporangium persica (Bory) Vis.
Oeosporangium pulchellum (Bory ex Willd.) Fraser-Jenk. & Pariyar
Oeosporangium smithii (C.Chr.) Fraser-Jenk. & Pariyar
Oeosporangium stramineum (Ching) Fraser-Jenk.
Oeosporangium subvillosum (Hook.) Fraser-Jenk. & Pariyar
Oeosporangium nudiusculum (R.Br.) comb. ined.
Oeosporangium tenuifolium (Burm.f.) Fraser-Jenk. & Pariyar
Oeosporangium thwaitesii (Mett. ex Kuhn) Fraser-Jenk.
Oeosporangium tinaei (Tod.) Fraser-Jenk.
Oeosporangium tirajanae (T.S.Velázquez) comb. ined.
Oeosporangium trichophyllum (Baker) Fraser-Jenk.
Oeosporangium velutinum (Tardieu & C.Chr.) Fraser-Jenk.
Oeosporangium viride (Forsk.) Fraser-Jenk. & Pariyar
Oeosporangium yunnanense (Ching) Fraser-Jenk. & Pariyar

References

Pteridaceae
Fern genera